William Wood Dillicar (21 June 1881 – 28 July 1962) was a New Zealand lawn bowls player who competed for his country at the 1934 British Empire Games.

Early life and family 
Born on 21 June 1881, Dillicar was the son of Richard and Mary Ann Dillicar who had settled in Hamilton the previous year. On 24 March 1913, he married Ida May Francis at the Congregational Church, Palmerston North, but they divorced in 1925. Dillicar went on to marry Marjorie Evelyn Arey, the daughter of bookseller William Ewbank Arey and sister-in-law of Roderick Braithwaite, in Auckland on 20 June 1935.

Dillicar's sister, Alice, was the mother of Harold Turbott.

Lawn bowls
A member of the Whitiora Bowling Club, Dillicar was selected to represent New Zealand in the men's fours at the 1934 British Empire Games in London, alongside three bowlers from Auckland's Carlton Bowling Club: namely Harold Grocott, George Pollard, and George Carter (skip). At the Games, they won four of their nine round-robin matches to finish in fifth place.

Other activities
With his brother, Dillicar established the Hamilton grocers' firm of Dillicar Brothers. For many years, Dillicar was the bellringer at St Paul's Methodist church in Hamilton. He also served as a member of the Hamilton Borough Council.

Death
Dillicar died on 28 July 1962, and he was buried at Hamilton West Cemetery. He had been predeceased by his second wife, Marjorie, in 1953.

References

External links
 Photograph of Billy Dillicar and other members of the New Zealand lawn bowls team at the 1934 British Empire Games in London, Northern Advocate, 14 September 1934, p. 10

1881 births
1962 deaths
Bowls players at the 1934 British Empire Games
Burials at Hamilton West Cemetery
Commonwealth Games competitors for New Zealand
Local politicians in New Zealand
New Zealand businesspeople in retailing
New Zealand male bowls players
New Zealand Methodists
Sportspeople from Hamilton, New Zealand